Alexandre "Alex" Czerniatynski (born 28 July 1960) is a Belgian former footballer who played as a striker.

Club career
Czerniatynski played for Charleroi, Antwerp, Anderlecht, Standard, Antwerp again, KV Mechelen, Germinal Ekeren and Tilleur-Liège. He was part of the team when Antwerp played its last European final against Parma in 1993, as well as in that of Anderlecht for its two European finals in 1983 and 1984 (scoring in the latter). Anderlecht played its last European final in 1990.

International career
Czerniatynski played 31 games, scoring six goals, for Belgium. He was also in the Belgian team for the 1982, scoring one goal, and 1994 World Cups as well as for the Euro 1984 but he did not play a game in that tournament.

Coaching career
On 27 April 2009, K.S.K. Beveren officials sacked Czerniatynski as coach. On 6 June 2010, it was announced that Czerniatynski would become the new head coach of Olympic Charleroi.

Honours

Player 
Anderlecht Belgian First Division: 1984–85
 UEFA Cup: 1982–83; runner-up 1983–84
 Jules Pappaert Cup: 1983, 1985Standard Liège Belgian Cup: runner-up 1987–88, 1988–89Royal Antwerp Belgian Cup: 1991–92
 UEFA Cup Winners' Cup: runner-up 1992–93Germinal Ekeren'''
 Belgian Cup: 1996–97

Individual 
 European Cup Winners Cup top scorer: 1992–93 (seven goals)

References

External links
 
 
 

1960 births
Living people
Belgian footballers
Belgium international footballers
Belgian people of Polish descent
Association football forwards
Belgian Pro League players
R. Charleroi S.C. players
Royal Antwerp F.C. players
R.S.C. Anderlecht players
Standard Liège players
K.V. Mechelen players
Beerschot A.C. players
RFC Liège players
1982 FIFA World Cup players
UEFA Euro 1984 players
1994 FIFA World Cup players
Belgian football managers
K.S.K. Beveren managers
Royale Union Saint-Gilloise managers
K.V. Mechelen managers
Sportspeople from Charleroi
Footballers from Hainaut (province)
UEFA Cup winning players
Sportkring Sint-Niklaas managers
RFC Liège managers